Gavrilă Birău (also known as Gabor Biro; born 10 February 1945) is a Romanian former football right defender and manager. He was part of UTA's team that in the 1970–1971 European Cup season eliminated Feyenoord who were European champions at that time. A book about him was written by Radu Romănescu and Ionel Costin, called Gabi Birău – povestea fundașului de fier (Gabi Birău – the story of the iron defender), which was released with the occasion of his 73rd birthday.

Honours
UTA Arad
Divizia A: 1968–69, 1969–70
Cupa României runner-up: 1965–66

References

External links

Gavrilă Birău at Labtof.ro

1945 births
Living people
Romanian footballers
Association football defenders
Liga I players
Liga II players
FC UTA Arad players
Romanian football managers
FC UTA Arad managers
People from Sfântu Gheorghe
20th-century Romanian people